The Rapture: In the Twinkling of an Eye/Countdown to the Earth's Last Days is the 3rd prequel novel in the Left Behind series, written by Tim LaHaye and Jerry B. Jenkins in 2006. This book is the final of the three prequels and covers events leading up to the first book Left Behind. The narrative of the novel The Rapture includes events that take place during the first chapters of Left Behind and provides a backdrop story for the book Left Behind. The book was released on Tuesday, June 6, 2006 (6/6/6), which is the Number of the Beast, a concept that plays a large part later in the series. It takes place from 14 months before to the day of the Rapture.

Plot summary
The stage is set as Nicolae Carpathia ruthlessly eliminates any obstacles in his rise to power. Pan-Con Airlines Captain Rayford Steele prepares for a flight to London with beautiful flight attendant Hattie Durham. Because of his wife's newfound faith, Rayford looks forward to time—and the possibilities—with Hattie.

Journalist Cameron "Buck" Williams is in Israel when the Arab countries attack, and he experiences for himself the power of God when fire rains down from the sky, destroying the attackers. Even more, not a single casualty is reported in all of Israel. Buck cannot deny Chicago bureau chief Lucinda Washington's insistence that the event was prophesied in Ezekiel 38,39 and clearly of the supernatural, though he dares not consider the personal ramifications. Meanwhile, Nicolae Carpathia eliminates any obstacles in his path to power. As the newly appointed President of Romania, Nicolae is invited to speak before the UN.

Without warning, millions disappear and are inducted into Heaven, and believers from all over space and time reunite in the house of God, as prophesied in 1 Thessalonians 4:15–17. The Judgment Seat of Christ takes place and the saints of the ages are rewarded for their perseverance with crowns from Christ himself. They are followed into Heaven, where they see the glory prepared for them by the Lord. On Earth, some realize what has happened, what they have lost, what they have missed, and the world plunges into chaos as drivers, pilots, and pedestrians of all occupations go missing. Rayford's first officer, Chris Smith, is among the first to commit suicide in the wake of the disappearances and the ensuing chaos. Pastor Bruce Barnes is among those left behind, and the young pastor knows that the disappearances signal the beginning of the Tribulation.

Characters
 Captain Rayford Steele
 Chloe Steele
 Cameron "Buck" Williams
 Pastor Bruce Barnes
 Steve Plank
 Abdullah Ababneh aka Abdullah Smith
 President Nicolae Carpathia
 Leon Fortunato
 Hattie Durham
 Loretta, mentioned as an older church secretary
 Gerald Fitzhugh, the President of the United States
 Gheorghe Vasile, the President of Romania
 Amanda White, Rayford's second wife she will appear in Tribulation Force
 Chris Smith, The Co-pilot with Rayford the night of the Rapture

In Heaven
 Jesus Christ
 Raymie Steele
 Irene Steele
 Lucinda Washington
 Pastor Vernon Billings

Release details
 2006, USA, Tyndale House, Pub date ? June 2006, hardback (First edition)

Left Behind series
2006 American novels
Apocalyptic novels
Prequel novels
Novelistic portrayals of Jesus
Novels set in Chicago
Novels set in Israel
Novels set in London
Novels set in New York City